The 2010 ICC World Cricket League Division Eight was a cricket tournament that took place from November 6 to 12, 2010 in Kuwait. It formed part of the World Cricket League competition administered by the International Cricket Council, the international governing body for cricket.

Teams
Relegated from 2009 Division Seven

The remaining six teams were determined by the ICC Development Committee based on prior regional results and other factors.
They were:-

 as hosts

Squads

Group stage
The ICC development committee confirmed the groups on 10 June 2010.

Group A

Matches

Group B

Matches

Play-offs

Semifinals and Final

Plate

Rankings

Statistics

See also
 World Cricket League

References 

2010 Division Eight